Du Cane may refer to any of the following:

People
 Alfred du Cane (1835–1882), English clergyman and cricketer
 Charles Du Cane (1825–1889), British politician
 Edmund Frederick Du Cane (1830–1903), British Army major general
 Ella Du Cane (1874–1943), British artist
 John Du Cane, American entrepreneur
 John Philip Du Cane (1865–1947), British Army general
 Peter Du Cane, the elder (1645–1714), Huguenot businessman in London
 Peter Du Cane Sr. (1713–1803), British merchant and businessman
 Peter Du Cane (boat designer) (1901–1984), British boat designer
 Richard Du Cane (1681–1744), British politician

Landmarks
Du Cane Court, largest privately owned block of flats under one roof in Europe
Du Cane Range, mountain range

Other
Frederick DuCane Godman (1834–1919), English lepidopterist, entomologist and ornithologist
Du Kane, member of the Beautiful People